Crowded is a comic book series that were published by Image Comics from August 2018 to March 2020 with a stand-alone final volume in February 2022.

Synopsis 
Charlie Ellison becomes the target of Reapr's million dollar campaign and hires bodyguard Vita.

Prints

Issues

Collected volumes

Reception 
Joshua Davison from Bleeding Cool, reviewing the first issue, praised the writer and artists. Nicole Drum from ComicBook.com wrote that "Crowded #1 sets up a deeply through-provoking story in a way that is entertaining and engaging".

References 

2018 comics debuts
Image Comics titles
2020 comics endings